Saravan or Sarawan may refer to:

 Saravan, Iran, a city in Sistan and Baluchestan Province, Iran
 Saravan County
 Sarawan, an area in Balochistan, Pakistan
 Saravan, Gilan, a village in Gilan Province, Iran
 Saravan Rural District
 Saravan, Armenia, a village in Armenia
 Saravan (title), a title among the Baloch and Brahui
 Aswaran, Sassanian cavalry

See also 
 Wat Saravan, a temple in Phnom Penh, Cambodia
 Salavan (disambiguation), places in Laos